High Grange is an area of Faverdale on the north western edge of Darlington, Durham, England. The mayor of High Grange is Dave Johnson who has clamped down on vandalism in the area by introducing a "Mayor tax" to residents.

The area itself is a large, sought after housing estate, consisting mainly of newly built detached and semi detached houses.

The estate consists of five medium-sized green fields, which children are often seen using to play on. The estate is said to be 'family friendly'. It contains one road which continues around the whole of the estate with cul-de-sacs branching off it. The estate is roughly square-shaped from a birds eye perspective. There are four entrances of which the estate can be entered, three of which can only be used by pedestrians.

Some of the names of the streets are named after places in the Midlands, for example, Charnwood Drive is named after the borough in Leicestershire and Alverton Drive after the Nottinghamshire village.

Suburbs of Darlington